AstroTurf is an American subsidiary of SportGroup that produces artificial turf for playing surfaces in sports. The original AstroTurf product was a short-pile synthetic turf invented in 1965 by Monsanto. Since the early 2000s, AstroTurf has marketed taller pile systems that use infill materials to better replicate natural turf. In 2016, AstroTurf became a subsidiary of German-based SportGroup, a family of sports surfacing companies, which itself is owned by the investment firm Equistone Partners Europe.

History

The original AstroTurf brand product was invented by James M. Faria and Robert T. Wright at Monsanto.  The original, experimental installation was inside the Waughhtel-Howe Field House at the Moses Brown School in Providence, Rhode Island in 1964.   It was patented in 1965 and originally sold under the name "ChemGrass."  It was rebranded as AstroTurf by company employee John A. Wortmann after its first well-publicized use at the Houston Astrodome stadium in 1966. Donald L. Elbert patented two methods to improve the product in 1971.

Early iterations of the short-pile turf swept many major stadiums, but the product did need improvement. Concerns over directionality and traction led Monsanto's R&D department to implement a texturized nylon system. By imparting a crimped texture to the nylon after it was extruded, the product became highly uniform.

In 1987, Monsanto consolidated its AstroTurf management, marketing, and technical activities in Dalton, Georgia, as AstroTurf Industries, Inc. In 1988, Balsam AG purchased all the capital stock of AstroTurf Industries, Inc. In 1994, Southwest Recreational Industries, Inc. (SRI) acquired the AstroTurf brand. In 1996, SRI was acquired by American Sports Products Group Inc.

While AstroTurf was the industry leader throughout the late 20th century, other companies emerged in the early 2000s. FieldTurf, AstroTurf's chief competitor since the early 2000s, marketed a product of tall-pile polyethylene turf with infill, meant to mimic natural grass more than the older products. This third-generation turf, as it became known, changed the landscape of the marketplace.  Although SRI successfully marketed AstroPlay, a third-generation turf product, increased competition gave way to lawsuits. In 2000, SRI was awarded $1.5 million in a lawsuit after FieldTurf was deemed to have lied to the public by making false statements regarding its own product and making false claims about AstroTurf and AstroPlay products.

Despite their legal victory, increased competition took its toll.  In 2004, SRI declared bankruptcy. Out of the bankruptcy proceedings, Textile Management Associates, Inc. (TMA) of Dalton, Georgia, acquired the AstroTurf brand and other assets. TMA began marketing the AstroTurf brand under the company AstroTurf, LLC. In 2006, General Sports Venue (GSV) became TMA's marketing partner for the AstroTurf brand for the American market. AstroTurf, LLC handled the marketing of AstroTurf in the rest of the world.

In 2009, TMA acquired GSV to enter the marketplace as a direct seller.  AstroTurf, LLC focused its efforts on research and development, which has promoted rapid growth. AstroTurf introduced new product features and installation methods, including AstroFlect (a heat-reduction technology) and field prefabrication (indoor, climate-controlled inlaying). AstroTurf also introduced a product called "RootZone" consisting of crimped fibers designed to encapsulate infill.

In 2016, SportGroup Holding announced that it would purchase AstroTurf, along with its associated manufacturing facilities.  The AstroTurf brand now operates in North America as AstroTurf Corporation.

In August 2021, AstroTurf became the official supplier of artificial turf to the United Soccer League, who run soccer leagues at the second, third, and fourth tiers of the U.S. men's soccer pyramid and the second tier of the U.S. women's soccer pyramid.

1960s

1964
 The Moses Brown School in Providence, Rhode Island, installs ChemGrass.

1966
 First major installation of AstroTurf (ChemGrass) at the Houston Astrodome indoor stadium for the Houston Astros. The infield portion was in place before opening day in April; the outfield was installed in early summer.

1967
 AstroTurf is first installed in an outdoor stadium—Memorial Stadium at Indiana State University in Terre Haute.

1968
 AstroTurf manufacturing facility opens in Dalton, Georgia.

1969
 The backyard of The Brady Bunch house between the service porch and garage and under Tiger's kennel is covered with AstroTurf.  According to script development notes, the installation firm hired by Mike Brady to lay the turf was owned by his college roommate, who had just started a landscaping business after returning from a combat tour in the Vietnam War with the 18th Engineer Brigade. In keeping with studio instructions, no direct mention of the war in Vietnam appeared in the script.  The scene in which the installation takes place was ultimately cut, so never appeared in the series.

1970s

1970
 The 1970 World Series is the first with games on AstroTurf (previously installed at Cincinnati's Riverfront Stadium), as the Reds play the Baltimore Orioles.

1971
 The CFL's Hamilton Tiger-Cats install AstroTurf at their home stadium, Ivor Wynne Stadium, in preparation for hosting the Grey Cup game the following year.

1972
 The Kansas City Chiefs home field of Arrowhead Stadium and the Kansas City Royals home field of Royals Stadium (now Kauffman Stadium) open in Kansas City, Missouri, with AstroTurf playing surfaces.

1973
 The Buffalo Bills' home field of Rich Stadium (later Ralph Wilson Stadium, and now Highmark Stadium) opens in Orchard Park, New York, with an AstroTurf playing surface.

1974
 The Miami Dolphins face the Minnesota Vikings on AstroTurf (the first Super Bowl played on the surface, but not the first to be played on artificial turf; that was Super Bowl V (in 1971) with Poly-Turf) in Super Bowl VIII – Rice Stadium, Houston, Texas.

1975
 The first international field hockey game is played on AstroTurf at Molson Stadium, Montreal.

1980s
1980
 The Philadelphia Phillies and Kansas City Royals play the entire 1980 World Series on AstroTurf in their ballparks.

1984
 AstroTurf installs the first North American vertical drainage systems in Ewing, New Jersey, at Trenton State College (now known as The College of New Jersey).

1985
 The St. Louis Cardinals and Kansas City Royals play the entire 1985 World Series on AstroTurf in their ballparks.

1987
 The St. Louis Cardinals and Minnesota Twins play the entire 1987 World Series on AstroTurf in their ballparks.

1989
 The first E-Layer system (Elastomeric) is installed at the College of William & Mary, as well as the University of California, Berkeley.

1990s

1993

1999
 Real Madrid C.F. (Spain) becomes the first European football club to purchase an AstroTurf system for their practice fields.

References

External links
 

Products introduced in 1964
Artificial turf
Houston Astros